Tomicodon is a genus of clingfishes native to the Western Hemisphere, with these currently recognized species:
 Tomicodon absitus Briggs, 1955 (distant clingfish)
 Tomicodon abuelorum Szelitowski, 1990
 Tomicodon australis Briggs, 1955
 Tomicodon bidens Briggs, 1969 (bifid clingfish)
 Tomicodon boehlkei Briggs, 1955 (Cortez clingfish)
 Tomicodon briggsi J. T. Williams & J. C. Tyler, 2003
 Tomicodon chilensis Brisout de Barneville, 1846 (smallsucker clingfish)
 Tomicodon clarkei J. T. Williams & J. C. Tyler, 2003
 Tomicodon cryptus J. T. Williams & J. C. Tyler, 2003
 Tomicodon eos (D. S. Jordan & C. H. Gilbert, 1882) (Rosy clingfish)
 Tomicodon fasciatus (W. K. H. Peters, 1859) (Barred clingfish)
 Tomicodon humeralis (C. H. Gilbert, 1890) (Sonora clingfish)
 Tomicodon lavettsmithi J. T. Williams & J. C. Tyler, 2003
 Tomicodon leurodiscus J. T. Williams & J. C. Tyler, 2003
 Tomicodon myersi Briggs, 1955 (blackstripe clingfish)
 Tomicodon petersii (Garman, 1875) (Peter's clingfish)
 Tomicodon prodomus Briggs, 1969
 Tomicodon reitzae Briggs, 2001
 Tomicodon rhabdotus Smith-Vaniz, 1969
 Tomicodon rupestris (Poey, 1860)
 Tomicodon vermiculatus Briggs, 1955
 Tomicodon zebra (D. S. Jordan & C. H. Gilbert, 1882) (zebra clingfish)

References

Gobiesocidae
Taxa named by Charles N. F. Brisout
Marine fish genera